Michael McGriff is an American poet.

Life
McGriff was born and raised in Coos Bay, Oregon. His work has appeared in Slate, Field, AGNI, The Believer, Missouri Review, and Poetry. He is the founding editor of Tavern Books, a publishing house dedicated to poetry in translation and the revival of out-of-print books.

McGriff's book Home Burial (Copper Canyon Press, 2012)  chronicles the dissolution of a people and their landscape - the coastal Pacific Northwest. His most recent book of poetry, Early Hour, is a book length sequence inspired by German Expressionist Karl Hofer's 1935 painting (Fruhe Stunde) of the same name.

McGriff currently teaches creative writing at the University of Idaho.

Awards

 Stegner Fellowship from Stanford University
 Ruth Lilly Fellowship from The Poetry Foundation
 Michener Fellowship from the University of Texas at Austin
 2007 Agnes Lynch Starrett Poetry Prize, for Dismantling the Hills
 2010 Lannan Literary Fellowship
 2013 Levis Reading Prize from Virginia Commonwealth University

Works
"Year of the Rat", Courtland Review, Spring 2009
 
 
 Home Burial (Copper Canyon Press, 2012)
 Black Postcards (Willow Springs Books, 2017)
 Early Hour (Copper Canyon Press, 2017)
 Eternal Sentences (The University of Arkansas Press, 2021)

Anthology

Translation
 "From July ’90", Tomas Tranströmer, AGNI 65, 2007
 "Landscape with Suns", Tomas Tranströmer, AGNI 65, 2007

References

External links
"Michael McGriff Q&A recommends two poets", Fishouse

Year of birth missing (living people)
Living people
Agnes Lynch Starrett Poetry Prize winners
American male poets
Poets from Oregon
Stanford University faculty